The Boys Amateur Championship is a golf tournament which is held annually in the United Kingdom. The competition is organised and run by The R&A.

History
The Boys Amateur Championship was first played at Royal Ascot in 1921. In 1921 boys had to be under-16 but this was raised to under-17 in 1922 and to under-18 in 1923, which is the age limit that has been retained since.

The venue for the competition has been played at many golf courses throughout the United Kingdom and has frequented several golf courses on more than one occasion. Notably the first two completion were both played at Royal Ascot.

The first championship started on 5 September 1921 with nearly 50 boys competing. The first day saw 14-year-old Henry Cotton play the eventual winner, Donald Mathieson, Cotton losing by 2 holes. Cotton was all square after 16 holes but lost the 17th, after being incorrectly penalised for placing his bag in a bunker, and then went out of bounds at the final hole. The Scot, Mathieson, met an English boy, Guy Lintott in the 36-hole final. Lincott won the final three holes to tie the match but Mathieson won the 37th hole to win the championship. Mathieson was the son of Donald MacKay Mathieson, a well-known golf journalist.

Format
The current format for the Boys Amateur Championship has been used since 2010 and comprises an initial stroke play stage with all 252 competitors playing two rounds of 18 holes, one on each of the two courses. The 64 lowest scores over the 36 holes and ties then compete in the match play final stage of the Championship. Each round of the knockout is played over 18 holes with the exception of the final which is played over 36 holes. Boys must be under 18 at the start of the year in which the championship is held.

The 2020 event was cancelled, while the 2021 event was run with a reduced field of 144 played at a single venue, Royal Cinque Ports.

Results

Source:

Future venues
2023 - Ganton
2024 - Alwoodley

References

External links

Junior golf tournaments
R&A championships
Amateur golf tournaments in the United Kingdom
Youth sport in the United Kingdom
1921 establishments in the United Kingdom
Recurring sporting events established in 1921